The 2007–08 OPJHL season is the 15th season of the Ontario Provincial Junior A Hockey League (OPJHL). The thirty-five teams of the North, South, East, and West divisions will compete in a 49-game schedule.

Come February, the top six teams of each division competed for the Frank L. Buckland Trophy, the OJHL championship.  The winner of the Buckland Cup, the Oakville Blades, competed in the Central Canadian Junior "A" championship, the Dudley Hewitt Cup, and won.  Once successful against the winners of the Northern Ontario Junior Hockey League and Superior International Junior Hockey League, the champion Blades then moved on to play in the Canadian Junior A Hockey League championship, the 2008 Royal Bank Cup where they finished last.

Changes
Couchiching Terriers are back for 2007-08
Streetsville Derbys have moved to Rexdale
Oswego Admirals are now Toronto Dixie Beehives
Trenton Sting are now Quinte West Pack
Toronto Thunderbirds are now Villanova Knights
Bancroft Hawks are folding for 2007-08 season
Bramalea Blues are folding for 2007-08 season

Final standings
as of February 13, 2008

Note: GP = Games played; W = Wins; L = Losses; OTL = Overtime losses; SL = Shootout losses; GF = Goals for; GA = Goals against; PTS = Points; x = clinched playoff berth; y = clinched division title; z = clinched conference title

Please note: (x-) denotes playoff berth, (y-) denotes elimination, (zx-) denotes first round bye.

Teams listed on the official league website .

Standings listed by Pointstreak on official league website .

2007-08 Frank L. Buckland Trophy Playoffs

Note: E is East, S is South, W is West, N is North, WC is Wild Card.

Playoff results are listed by Pointstreak on the official league website .

Dudley Hewitt Cup Championship
Hosted by the Newmarket Hurricanes in Newmarket, Ontario.  Oakville finished first, Newmarket finished second.

Round Robin
Oakville Blades 5 - Dryden Ice Dogs 1
Newmarket Hurricanes 5 - Sudbury Jr. Wolves 1
Oakville Blades 5 - Sudbury Jr. Wolves 3
Newmarket Hurricanes 7 - Dryden Ice Dogs 1
Oakville Blades 5 - Newmarket Hurricanes 2
Semi-final
Newmarket Hurricanes 2 - Dryden Ice Dogs 1 OT
Final
Oakville Blades 6 - Newmarket Hurricanes 3

2008 Royal Bank Cup Championship
Hosted by Cornwall Colts in Cornwall, Ontario.  Oakville finished fifth.

Round Robin
Cornwall Colts 5 - Oakville Blades 4
Weeks Crushers 4 - Oakville Blades 3 OT
Oakville Blades 7 - Humboldt Broncos 6
Camrose Kodiaks 6 - Oakville Blades 1

Scoring leaders
Note: GP = Games played; G = Goals; A = Assists; Pts = Points; PIM = Penalty minutes

Leading goaltenders
Note: GP = Games played; Mins = Minutes played; W = Wins; L = Losses: OTL = Overtime losses; SL = Shootout losses; GA = Goals Allowed; SO = Shutouts; GAA = Goals against average

Players selected in 2008 NHL Entry Draft
Rd 2 #36	Corey Trivino -	New York Islanders	(Stouffville Spirit)
Rd 2 #52	Brandon Burlon -	New Jersey Devils	(St. Michael's Buzzers)
Rd 6 #179	Braden Birch -	Chicago Blackhawks	(Oakville Blades)
Rd 7 #185	Paul Karpowich -	St. Louis Blues	(Wellington Dukes)
Rd 7 #210	Nicholas D'Agostino -	Pittsburgh Penguins	(St. Michael's Buzzers)

See also
 2008 Royal Bank Cup
 Dudley Hewitt Cup
 List of OJHL seasons
 Northern Ontario Junior Hockey League
 Superior International Junior Hockey League
 Greater Ontario Junior Hockey League
 2007 in ice hockey
 2008 in ice hockey

References

External links
 Official website of the Ontario Junior Hockey League
 Official website of the Canadian Junior Hockey League

Ontario Junior Hockey League seasons
OPJHL